77 may refer to the year 1977. It may also refer to:

 Talking Heads: 77, a 1977 Talking Heads studio album
 77 (film), a 2007 comedy film also known as 5-25-77

See also
 77 (disambiguation)